This article shows all participating team squads at the 2008 Men's Pan-American Volleyball Cup, held from June 2 to June 7, 2008 in Winnipeg, Manitoba, Canada.

Head Coach: Glenn Hoag

Head Coach: Juan Acuña

Head Coach: Jacinto Campechano

Head Coach: Jorge Azair

Head Coach: Ángel Rivera

Head Coach: Augusto Sabbatini

Head Coach: Alan Knipe

References
NORCECA

S
P